The Bob Hope Stakes is a Grade III American Thoroughbred horse race for two-year-olds over a distance of seven furlongs on the dirt track scheduled annually in November at Del Mar Racetrack in Del Mar, California. The event currently carries a purse of $100,000.

History

The event was inaugurated on 14 November 1981 as the Hollywood Prevue Stakes at Hollywood Park Racetrack and was won by the undefeated Sepulveda who was trained by the US Hall of Fame trainer D. Wayne Lukas and ridden by the US Hall of Fame jockey Chris McCarron in a time of 1:22 flat.

In 1985 the event was classified as Grade III and has remained this status since.

Between 1990 and 1995, the Breeders' Cup sponsored the event which reflected in the name of the event.

From 2006 to 2014 it was held on a synthetic dirt surface.

With the closure of Hollywood Park Racetrack in 2013 the event was renamed to the Bob Hope Stakes and moved to Del Mar Racetrack. Actor Bob Hope, frequented the Del Mar racetrack often and made seven "Road" musical comedy movies with Bing Crosby, who was the Del Mar Turf Club original president and de facto publicist.

Records
Speed record:
1:20.63 - Lion Heart (2003) 
 
Margins:
 lengths – Shared Belief (2013)
 lengths – Red Flag (2020)

Most wins by a jockey:
 5 - Victor Espinoza (2000, 2004, 2014, 2017, 2020)

Most wins by a trainer:
 12 - Bob Baffert (1996, 1997, 1998, 2007, 2011, 2012, 2004, 2015, 2016, 2018, 2019, 2021, 2022)

Most wins by an owner:
 4 - Michael E. Pegram (1997, 2012, 2015, 2022)

Winners

Legend:

 
 

Notes:

§ Ran as an entry

† Field

See also
List of American and Canadian Graded races

External links
 2020 Del Mar Media Guide

References

Horse races in California
Del Mar Racetrack
Flat horse races for two-year-olds
Graded stakes races in the United States
Recurring sporting events established in 1981
1981 establishments in California
Grade 3 stakes races in the United States